Alban Berg's Piano Sonata, Op. 1, was published in 1910, but the exact date of composition is unknown; sources suggest that it was written in 1909. The Sonata is Berg's only piano work to which he gave an opus number.

History
Berg first studied under Arnold Schoenberg in the autumn of 1904, taking lessons in harmony and counterpoint. Later, in autumn 1907, he returned to begin studies in composition, which ended with the study of sonata movements. Several draft sketches of sonata movements date from this period and it is thought that Op. 1 followed from these drafts. The exact date of composition is unknown; although the second reissue of the score bears the date 1908, sources suggest that the Sonata was not composed until the spring or summer of 1909 (Scheideler, 2006). The premiere of the Piano Sonata, Op. 1 was given in Vienna on 24 April 1911 by Etta Werndorff. Other works by Berg and Anton Webern were also played at that concert. Pianist Léo-Pol Morin notably performed the work for its Parisian premiere in 1922.  The work underwent alterations for republication in 1920 and further changes were made in 1925 for publication of a "revised edition" (Ibid.).

Composition and structure
The sonata is not in the typical classical form of three or four contrasting movements, but consists of a single movement centered in the key of B minor. Berg originally intended for the Sonata to be a more traditional multi-movement work, the opening movement followed by a slow movement and a finale. However, for a long period he lacked any ideas for these other movements. Berg turned to Schoenberg, who commented that the lack of inspiration meant that '[Berg] ... had said all there was to say'. Following Schoenberg's advice, Berg decided to publish the finished movement and let it stand by itself.

Although the piece has the nominal key of B minor, Berg makes frequent use of chromaticism, whole-tone scales, and wandering key centers, giving the tonality a very unstable feel, which only resolves in the final few bars. The structure of the piece is traditional sonata form, with an exposition, development and recapitulation; however, the composition also relies heavily on Arnold Schoenberg's idea of "developing variation", a method to ensure the unity of a piece of music by deriving all aspects of a composition from a single idea. In this case, much of the composition can be traced back to the two opening gestures.

References
Scheidler, Ullrich (2006). Preface to the Urtext Edition. Munich: G. Henle Verlag.

External links 
 
recording by Jonathan Biss from the Isabella Stewart Gardner Museum in MP3 format
 Recording by Harvard Fellow Seda Röder
 Recording by Dr. Willis G. Miller, III
Recording of the Theo Verbey orchestration by Riccardo Chailly and the Royal Concertgebouw Orchestra
 Listen to the elaboration for 8 instruments on Magazzini Sonori

Compositions by Alban Berg
Berg
1909 compositions